The Punisher is an American comic book series published from 2014 to 2015 by Marvel Comics featuring the character Frank Castle, also known as the vigilante the Punisher. The series lasted 20 issues and was written by Nathan Edmondson, with art by Mitch Gerads.

Reception
The series holds an average rating of 7.5 by 132 professional critics on the review aggregation website Comic Book Roundup.

Of the first issue, IGN's Benjamin Bailey said Edmondson and Gerads embrace that Punisher is a hard character to write, and that they "give [readers] a story about the Punisher moving to Los Angeles and spraying bullets in the direction of those who deserve it." Bailey also stated that the first issue "...reads like the opening to a kick-butt action flick." However, Bailey was critical of some parts of the story, feeling that they were too similar to those from well-established runs like Garth Ennis' tenure with the character under Marvel's adult MAX imprint. John Parker of the ComicsAlliance was especially complimentary of Gerads' art, saying that Gerads "...goes nuts on L.A.: from smog-hazed cityscapes to the desolate beauty of Yucca Valley, he nails the look and color of the environment, and drafts a Frank Castle that recalls classic versions by Mike Zeck, John Romita Jr., and Goran Parlov while being something entirely new. . .[Gerads] is a perfect fit for the book."

Prints

Issues

Collected editions

References

External links
 The Punisher (2014) at the Comic Book DB
 

2014 comics debuts
Punisher titles